Bandon is an unincorporated community in Oil Township, Perry County, in the U.S. state of Indiana.

History
A post office was established at Bandon in 1905, and remained in operation until 1955. The community was named after Bandon, in Ireland.

Geography

References

Unincorporated communities in Perry County, Indiana
Unincorporated communities in Indiana